The Finnish Basketball Hall of Fame is a hall of fame that is the highest honor that is bestowed upon people that have impacted the sport of basketball in Finland. New Hall of Fame members are chosen by the Hall's board of experts, coming from the Finnish Basketball Federation, the Finnish Basketball Foundation, the Sports Museum of Finland, among others. The first members were inducted in 2009.

In both August 2015, and 2016, four new people were inducted. In 2017, there were six new inductees, in 2018, four, and in 2019, eight.

Members

See also
Finnish Basketball Player of the Year
College Basketball Hall of Fame
Basketball Hall of Fame
 List of members of the Naismith Memorial Basketball Hall of Fame
 List of players in the Naismith Memorial Basketball Hall of Fame
 List of coaches in the Naismith Memorial Basketball Hall of Fame
FIBA Hall of Fame
 List of members of the FIBA Hall of Fame
EuroLeague Hall of Fame
Italian Basketball Hall of Fame
Greek Basket League Hall of Fame
French Basketball Hall of Fame
VTB United League Hall of Fame
Australian Basketball Hall of Fame
Philippine Basketball Association Hall of Fame
Women's Basketball Hall of Fame

Sources 
 Finnish Basketball Hall of Fame Official Site Finnish Basketball Museum

References 

Basketball in Finland
Basketball museums and halls of fame
Halls of fame in Finland
2009 establishments in Finland
European basketball awards